Kate Baxter (28 November 1930 – 23 March 2019) was an Australian fencer. She competed in the women's individual foil event at the 1960 Summer Olympics.

References

1930 births
2019 deaths
Australian female foil fencers
Olympic fencers of Australia
Fencers at the 1960 Summer Olympics
Sportswomen from New South Wales
Sportspeople from Sydney
20th-century Australian women